The Trenton Highlanders were an American soccer club based in Trenton, New Jersey that was a member of the professional American Soccer League.

The Highlanders had been previously an amateur club. Before the 1938/39 ASL season, the club was absorbed by Paterson Caledonian who moved to Trenton and took the amateur club's name.

After a single season in Trenton, the team returned to Paterson as Paterson F.C.

Year-by-year

References

Defunct soccer clubs in New Jersey
American Soccer League (1933–1983) teams
Sports in Trenton, New Jersey